William Russell House, also known as the Russell Farmhouse, is a historic home located at Lewes, Sussex County, Delaware. It was built in 1803, and is two-story, three-bay, double-pile, side-hall, frame house.  A rear wing consists of an original one-room addition and a 20th-century addition.  It is sheathed in cypress siding.  Also on the property is an original brick milk house.  It was the home of William Russell, a tanner and large landowner in early-19th-century Lewes.

It was added to the National Register of Historic Places in 1977.

References

Houses on the National Register of Historic Places in Delaware
Houses completed in 1803
Houses in Lewes, Delaware
National Register of Historic Places in Sussex County, Delaware